There are at least 4 named lakes and reservoirs in Stone County, Arkansas.

Lakes
According to the United States Geological Survey, there are no named lakes in Stone County, Arkansas.

Reservoirs
Crouch Lake, el.  
Davis Lake, el.  
Gunner Pool Lake, el.  
Mirror Lake, el.

See also
 List of lakes in Arkansas

Notes

Bodies of water of Stone County, Arkansas
Stone